The Showgrounds is a stadium in Sligo, which has been home of  Sligo Rovers since Rovers were formed in 1928.

Overview
The Showgrounds was leased until 1968 when it was then purchased for Sligo Rovers by a trust foundation representing the people of Sligo. Under the terms of the purchase it can never be mortgaged, sold or used for any commercial purposes other than sport and leisure. The Showgrounds is a 12 acre (49,000 m²) site with the stadium capacity of 3,873 seats.

On 8 November 1978 Sligo opened their new covered accommodation on the Jinks Avenue in a FAI League Cup semi final against Shamrock Rovers.

In November 2001 the new main stand was opened to the public for the League Cup fixture with St. Patrick's Athletic. The stand accommodates 1,853 seats, although there is available capacity for further seating. It has been built in cantilever style to ensure there is no obstructed view.

The Showgrounds was revamped in winter 2006 with the demolition of the ground's most famous "Shed". This was followed by the demolition of the ground's old famous turnstiles. New state of the art turnstiles were built along with front offices.
In March 2009 work was finished on a new club shop which is open on match nights. This is situated on the Tracey Avenue Stand side.

In May 2009 the Showgrounds had some major upgrading work done to enable the club to compete in the 2009-10 UEFA Europa League. This work included the building of a new fully tarred car park, along with upgrading work to both all seater stands. An extra 200 seats were added to the Red Stand and also new seating was put into the jinks side of the ground. This work brought the seating capacity of the ground up to 2,700 which was required for competing in the Europa League.

In July 2012 a new stand was completed at the Railway End consisting of 1,323 seats. In the 2016 domestic league season, the Sligo Rovers drew an average home attendance of 2,087, the fourth-highest in the league. 

As of 18 May 2021.

Future development
In the future there are plans to demolish the Jinks Avenue Stand and build a new 2,000 seater stand in its place. There are also plans to add a roof to the new Railway End and replace the old shed end with a new stand, though these plans are only in the pipeline. In May 2021 Rovers unveiled a €17 million plan to redevelop Showgrounds into a 6,000 capacity seater stadium, upgrading the facility to UEFA category 3. The redevelopment plan included a provisional agreement, which would see Connacht Rugby also use the ground for competitions.

Record attendance
13,908 FAI Cup semi-final replay: Sligo Rovers v Cobh Ramblers, 17 April 1983

Other uses
The Showgrounds hosted greyhound racing from c.1934 - c.1947, which was initially run by the Sligo Greyhound Racing Company. The North-Western Greyhound Association applied for a licence in September 1945 which was granted by the Irish Coursing Club to James Costello. The racing seems to have ended during 1947.

References

External links
 The Showgrounds Irish Football Grounds
 The Showgrounds History Sligo Rovers FC
 The Showgrounds: Home of Sligo Rovers FC Independent and unofficial website of Sligo Rovers FC

Association football venues in the Republic of Ireland
Sligo Rovers F.C.
Sports venues in County Sligo
Sport in Sligo (town)
Defunct greyhound racing venues in Ireland